This was the first year of the Wheelchair doubles. The tournament was played in a round robin format and Robin Ammerlaan and Stéphane Houdet won the league.

Draw

Standings
Standings are determined by: 1. number of wins; 2. number of matches; 3. in two-players-ties, head-to-head records; 4. in three-players-ties, percentage of sets won, or of games won; 5. steering-committee decision.

References
 Main Draw

Wheelchair doubles
ABN AMRO World Tennis Tournament, 2011